The 2020–21 season was the 34th season for FC Barcelona Femení. The team played in the domestic league, as well as the Copa de la Reina, the Supercopa de España, and UEFA Women's Champions League. They became the first Spanish women's club to win the continental treble, winning the league, Champions League, and Copa de la Reina.

Players

2020–21 squad

FC Barcelona Femení B

Contract renewals

Transfers

In

Out

Loans

Competitions

Pre-season

Primera División

League table

Results by round 
The table lists the position after each week of matches. In order to preserve chronological evolvements, any postponed matches are not included to the round at which they were originally scheduled, but added to the full round they were played immediately afterwards.

Matches

Copa de la Reina

Supercopa de España

Champions League 

Following the abandonment of the 2019–20 Primera División due to the COVID-19 pandemic, Barcelona and Atlético Madrid were selected by the RFEF to take the two Spain slots in the next year's Champions League. Due to Spain's high ranking, both teams entered in the knockout phase (round of 32), rather than go through qualifying.

Knockout phase

Round of 32

Round of 16

Quarter-finals

Barcelona advance 4–2 on aggregate

Semi-finals

Barcelona advance 3–2 on aggregate

Final

Notes

References 

FC Barcelona Femení seasons
2020–21 in Spanish women's football
Spanish football clubs 2020–21 season